Hylaeaicum peruvianum is a species of flowering plant in the family Bromeliaceae, endemic to Peru. It was first described by Lyman Bradford Smith in 1963 as Neoregelia peruviana.

References

Bromelioideae
Flora of Peru
Plants described in 1963